The 1958 municipal election was held October 15, 1958 to elect six aldermen to sit on Edmonton City Council, four trustees to sit on the separate school board, and three trustees to sit on the public school board.  There was no election for mayor, as William Hawrelak was one year into a two-year term.

There were ten aldermen on city council, but four of the positions were already filled: Cliffard Roy, William Connelly, Hu Harries, and Reginald Easton were all elected to two-year terms in 1957 and were still in office.  James Falconer was also elected to a two-year term in 1957, but had resigned; accordingly, William Henning was elected to a one-year term to complete Falconer's term.

There were seven trustees on the public school board, but four of the positions were already filled: Ernest Hanna, Angus MacDonald, Robert Johnson,  and Douglas Thomson were elected to two-year terms in 1957 and were still in office.  On the separate board, there were four vacancies: Orest Demco, Catherine McGrath, and Joseph Moreau were acclaimed to two-year terms in 1957 and were still in office.  Michael O'Byrne had also been acclaimed to a two-year term in 1957, but had resigned; accordingly, William Burke was elected to a one-year term to complete O'Byrne's term.

Voter turnout

There were 18650 ballots cast out of 145701 eligible voters, for a voter turnout of 12.8%.

Results

(bold indicates elected, italics indicate incumbent)

Aldermen

Public school trustees

Separate (Catholic) school trustees

Leo Lemieux - 2626
Vincent Dantzer - 2254
E D Stack - 2141
William Burke - 1789
Paul Norris - 1531
Terance Hughes - 1445
William Vetsch - 1239
William Belous - 933
Walter Sievers - 839

References

City of Edmonton: Edmonton Elections

1958
1958 elections in Canada
1958 in Alberta